Francis Theophilius "Frank" Brooke PC, JP, DL (1851 – 30 July 1920) was an Anglo-Irish Director of Dublin and South Eastern Railways and a member of the Earl of Ypres' Advisory Council. He was gunned down, aged 69, by elements of Michael Collins squad of the IRA. 
He was marked out for his activities as a judge, anti-republican activities, and his friendship with Sir John French. As an Irish Privy Councilor, Brooke was a signatory of the order proclaiming Dail Eireann illegal.

Family
Brooke was a cousin of Basil Brooke, 1st Viscount Brookeborough, the future Prime Minister of Northern Ireland. Brooke, a grandson of Hans Hastings, 12th Earl of Huntingdon, on his mother's side, and of Sir Henry Brooke, 1st Baronet, on his father's, was married twice; firstly to Alice Moore, a daughter of the Dean of Clogher, (d. 1909) and secondly to Agnes Hibbert. By his first wife he had three children; Alice Gertrude (later Doyne), Lt. Col. George Frank Brooke and Henry Hastings Brooke.

Career
Brooke was also Deputy Lieutenant of County Wicklow and County Fermanagh, a Lieutenant in the Royal Navy, a Justice of the Peace for County Fermanagh and a Privy Councillor of Ireland (1918), thus he was styled The Rt. Hon. Francis Brooke.

In July 1912 he had attended the house party at Wentworth Woodhouse hosted for George V's stay there.

Death
On 30 July 1920 Brooke was killed at his offices, in Dublin, allegedly by Irish Republican Army members Paddy Daly, Tom Keogh and Jim Slattery, in view of a colleague, who was spared. The inquest found Brooke had a pistol in his jacket pocket. Brookes killing has been termed the only outright political assassination of the Irish War of Independence.

References

Members of the Privy Council of Ireland
Deputy Lieutenants of Fermanagh
Deputy Lieutenants of Wicklow
1851 births
1920 deaths
Royal Navy officers
People killed in the Irish War of Independence
Deaths by firearm in Ireland